James Hopkins Smith Jr. (December 15, 1909 – November 24, 1982) was United States Assistant Secretary of the Navy (AIR) from 1953 to 1956 and then was head of the United States Agency for International Development from 1957 to 1959.

Biography

Smith was born in New York City on December 15, 1909.  His mother was the first female member of the Republican National Committee.  He was educated at the Groton School and then at Harvard University, receiving a bachelor's degree in 1931.  In December 1927, Smith learned how to fly a Curtiss JN-4 under the instruction of Charles Lindbergh, recently returned from his transatlantic flight.  Upon graduating from college, Smith enrolled in the United States Navy Reserve, and the next year attended Columbia Law School, receiving a law degree in 1932, although he never went on to practice law.

In 1933, Smith enlisted in the United States Navy and was a naval aviator from 1933 to 1941.  In 1941, he joined Pan American World Airways as manager of PanAm's operations in Africa.  In 1943, he returned to active service; he served in the Navy for another ten years, retiring in 1953, having attained the rank of captain.  During this period, Smith acquired the North Star Ranch outside Aspen, Colorado.

He competed at the 1948 Summer Olympics in London in the sailing competitions, where he won a gold medal in the 6 metre class with the boat Uanoria.

In 1953, President of the United States Dwight D. Eisenhower named Smith Assistant Secretary of the Navy (AIR) and Smith held this office from July 23, 1953 until June 20, 1956.  In 1954, Smith publicly admitted that the Navy had wrongly suspended Abraham Chasanow as a security risk in July 1953 and issued Chasanow a public apology for the "grave injustice" perpetrated on Chasanow, and vowing to overhaul security procedures.

After resigning in 1956, Smith moved to his ranch in Colorado to pursue life as a rancher, but the next year President Eisenhower asked him to head the United States Agency for International Development and he returned to Washington, D. C. in that capacity until his resignation in 1959.  Smith supported a strong foreign aid program, arguing to critics in the United States Congress that the ultimate goal of foreign aid must be not to win friends for the United States, but to allow poorer countries to become totally free of foreign domination.

After a two-year battle with cancer, Smith died at a hospital in La Jolla, San Diego, California on November 24, 1982.  He was survived by his wife, Diane; a son, Morgan, and three daughters, Joy, Dinah and Sandra.

References

Sources

 Kathleen Teltsch, "James H. Smith Jr.; Led U.S. Aid Agency," The New York Times, Nov. 25, 1982.
 James Smith papers at the Dwight D. Eisenhower Presidential Library

External links
 
 

1909 births
1982 deaths
United States Assistant Secretaries of the Navy
Harvard University alumni
Groton School alumni
American male sailors (sport)
Sailors at the 1948 Summer Olympics – 6 Metre
Olympic gold medalists for the United States in sailing
Medalists at the 1948 Summer Olympics
Deaths from cancer in California